"333" is a song by the punk rock band Against Me!. It was released in July 2016 as the first of three pre-release songs from the band's seventh album Shape Shift with Me.

The song was written on the band's European tour in 2015, after a visit to The Guggenheim art museum in Bilbao, Spain. Lyrics in the song make reference to various artworks there in 2015, including One Hundred and Fifty Multicolored Marilyns, The Renowned Orders of the Night and Tarot Garden.

Music video
A music video for the song was released on September 2, 2016. It was directed by Ione Skye (wife of friend of the band Ben Lee) and stars actors Natasha Lyonne and Andrew Howard.

Personnel
 Laura Jane Grace – guitar, vocals 
 James Bowman – guitar, backing vocals 
 Inge Johansson – bass guitar, backing vocals 
 Atom Willard – drums, percussion

References

2016 songs
Against Me! songs
Songs written by Laura Jane Grace
Songs written by James Bowman (musician)
Songs written by Atom Willard
Songs written by Inge Johansson